S̈, s̈ in lower case, also s with diaeresis, is a letter in the Chechen language, where it represents the voiceless postalveolar fricative. It has the same sound as the š used in Slavic languages written with the Latin alphabet, the Turkish/Romanian ş and the common digraph "sh".

In the Chechen language, it was changed from the original ş into s̈, at the same time that ç was changed into c̈.

In older Czech orthography s̈ was used in codas instead of ſſ for /ʃ/, modern orthography uses š for all instances.

In the Seneca language, s̈ represents /ʃ/.

It is also used in the digraph s̈h in the Shipibo language; s̈h represents /ʂ/, and sh (without the diaeresis) represents /ʃ/.

Latin letters with diacritics